Spanesh is a village situated in the central plains of Albania's Western Lowlands region. It is part of Tirana County. At the 2015 local government reform it became part of the municipality Rrogozhinë.

References

Populated places in Rrogozhinë
Villages in Tirana County